The Ministry of Culture, Sports and Tourism is the government ministry in Vietnam responsible for state administration on culture, family, sports and tourism nationwide; in addition to the management of public services in those field. The ministry was founded in 2007 after the merger of the Committee of Physical Training and Sports of Vietnam, General Department of Tourism, and Culture section from the Ministry of Culture and Information.

Ministerial units
 Department of Familial Affairs
 Department of Traditional Culture
 Department of Library
 Department of Science, Technology and Environment
 Department of Training
 Department of Legislation
 Department of Planning and Finance
 Department of International Cooperation
 Department of Organisation and Personnel
 Ministry's Inspectorate
 Ministry's Office
 General Agency for Tourism
 General Agency for Sports
 Agency for Fine Arts, Photography and Exhibition
 Agency for International Cooperation
 Agency for Foundation Culture
 Agency for Copyright
 Agency for Cinema
 Agency for Performing Arts
 Agency for Cultural Heritage

References

Culture, Sports and Tourism
Governmental office in Hanoi
Vietnam, Culture, Sports and Tourism
Vietnam
Vietnam
Vietnam